Shakila Qureshi, also spelled as Shakeela Qureshi, is a former Pakistani TV and film actress from the era of 1980s and 1990s. Her notable films include  Mr. 420 (1992) and Mr. Charlie (1993). She received the best TV actress Nigar Award in 1989.

Early life
Shakila was interested in acting from a young then she went to Lahore and from there she made her debut in a PTV drama.

Career
Shakila worked in PTV dramas during the 1980s. Her notable dramas include Aik Din, Samundar, Pyas, Kikar Kahday and many others such as Sona Chandi, Labbaik. She also showed her face in several TV commercials. In 1988, she opted for films and her debut movie was "Dushman", directed by S. Y. Ahmad. The following year in 1989 she received Nigar Award for Best TV Actress for her role as Shamshad in the PTV drama Pyaas.  Later, she was paired with the comedian actor Umer Shareef in movies Mr. 420 (1992), Mr. Charlie (1993), Miss Fitna (1993), and Baaghi Shehzaday (1995). Then she went back to work in dramas but after sometime, she retired in 2010.

Personal life
Shakila married the comedian Umer Shareef in 1995, but divorced him shortly after.

Filmography

Television series

Film

Stage dramas

Awards and recognition

References

External links
 

1962 births
20th-century Pakistani actresses
Living people
Actresses in Punjabi cinema
Pakistani film actresses
Nigar Award winners
Pakistani television actresses
Actresses in Sindhi cinema
Pakistani stage actresses
Actresses in Urdu cinema
21st-century Pakistani actresses